Aangan is a Pakistani period drama series based on the award-winning novel of the same name by Khadija Mastoor and originally broadcast on Hum TV. Apart from initial few episodes, the story which is set in British India is told as a narration by Aaliya who is an ambitious girl and witnesses the stories of relations affected at the time of partition of the Indian Subcontinent, presenting the trials and tribulations as her own family was divided. Sajal Aly's performances received widespread critical acclaim and is regarded as one of her and industry's best . 

The serial was created and produced by Momina Duraid under banner MD Productions and was directed by Mohammed Ehteshamuddin. Based on Mastoor's novel, the screenplay was written by Mustafa Afridi. The serial stars Mawra Hocane as Aaliya, Ahsan Khan as Subhan and Safdar (dual role), Sonya Hussyn as Salma, Sajal Aly as Chammi, Ahad Raza Mir as Jameel, Hira Mani as Tehmina and Rabia Butt as Kusum.

Aangan was highly anticipated with a huge star cast and a high production budget. It mostly received positive reviews from the critics and praise for cinematography, visuals and performances. It received multiple nomination at the 19th Lux Style Awards including Best Play, Best Actress for Aly and Best Director for Ehteshamuddin.

Plot
"The story is set in partition India. Khameera Illahi is a strict and serious matriarch of the haveli, having three sons and two daughters. Muzaffar, her husband, an unprincipled man who doesn't care for his family gets his son from another woman, Israr to the haveli. Although Khameera lets him stay in the haveli, Israr is never accepted in the family. Soniya, the young and beautiful daughter of Khameera, falls in love with a poor man Subhan. When her family opposes the affair, she runs away with Subhan. She dies after a few days due to TB leaving Subhan and her infant son Safder behind. Subhan leaves his son and goes away. Muzaffar dies and Mazhar takes responsibility of both Safder and his sister Nazma, when his wife opposes the arrangement, Nazma is sent to a boarding school to complete her education. Mazher and his family keep shifting because of his job.

A few years have passed and Majher's daughters Aaliya and Tehmina have grown up. Tehmina and Safder have feelings for each other. Aaliya and Tehmina befriend a Hindu widow, Kusum, who lives a lonely life and loves a man named Mohan. Due to the disapproval of Tehmina's mother to Tehmina's and Safder's relationship, her marriage gets fixed to Jameel, her cousin. Kusum commits suicide because of Mohan's betrayal. Safder not being courageous enough to take a stand on his and Tehmina's relationship, leaves a letter for her to get married and move forward in life. Tehmina commits suicide by eating poison. Majher gets arrested because he attacked a British officer and Aaliya and her mother shift back to haveli.

Haveli now mainly consists of six people, Khameera, her elder son, Azher who is usually busy in congress work and independence movement, his wife, his sons-Jameel, who he loathes because he is a jobless poet, and Shakeel, Chammi the abandoned daughter of Jafer and Ajhers niece, the old house help, Kareeman and Israr, who is always neglected.

Jameel keeps flirting with Chammi casually to fulfill the expenses of his education, not aware that she has actually fallen for him. He stops this after his education is completed and Aaliya comes to haveli. Jameel starts getting interested in Aaliya, while she keeps going away. Aaliya has started dreading love due to her past experience with Suman and Tehmina dying due to heartbreak.

While Chammi gets in touch with a boy in her neighbourhood , Jameel keeps persuading Aaliya even after her constant refusal.Aaliya does starts fee.ing for Jameel much to Chammi's dismay who actually has great consideration towards Aaliya.

Cast

Main

 Mawra Hocane as Aaliya
 Ahad Raza Mir as Jameel; a poet and a politician
 Sajal Aly as Chammi
 Ahsan Khan as Subhan, Safdar (dual role)
 Hira Mani as Tehmina; Aaliya's sister
 Sonya Hussyn as Salma; married to Subhan, Safdar's mother

Recurring
 Zaib Rehman as Khameera Illahi, the domineering matriarch of the haveli; Salma's mother
 Abid Ali as Muzaffar; Salma's father
 Omair Rana as Mazhar; Salma's brother and Aaliya's father
 Madiha Rizvi as Aaliya's mother
 Mustafa Afridi as Azhar; Salma's brother and Jameel's father
 Uzma Beg as Jameel's mother
 Hassan Noman as Israr; Muzaffar's son
 Shehroz Sabzwari as Dr. Ehsaan
 Rabia Butt as Kusum; a Hindu widow
 Shehryaar Ali as Shakeel
 Shabana Bhatti as Kareeman Bua
 Shehzad Kashmiri
 Ali Rizvi as Mohan; Kussum's love and ex-husband
 Shamayal Tareen as Najma; Salma's sister
 Haleema Bint Fatima as young Najma
 Waseem Manzoor as Zafar; Chammi’s father
 Akbar Islam as Kussum's father
 Khizer Gul
 Alizay Javed
 Mahjabeen Masroor
 Shazia Goher

Background and production

Writing
The novel Aangan was written by Khadija Mastoor in 1962, and won the Adamji Literacy Award in the next year. It was also translated into 13 languages, with The Women's Courtyard in English by Daisy Rockwell. While the original novel is set in the 1940s and 1950s, Dawn Images reported in December 2017 that this drama, which is based on that novel, is planned as a three-part series spanning a number of decades and will also feature the story of the 1980s and 2000s as in continuity.

The director Ehteshamuddin told The News in a March 2017 interview, "It was initially thought out as a film but now we're making a play out of it," adding, "We might turn it into a film later." He chose Mustafa Afridi to write the screenplay. Mustafa told Daily Times in a September 2018 interview that it took him a year to "understand the novel and a year and a half to adapt it" as a script. He commented that "all the characters have been defined in" skilled great detail by the author, and he worked hard to "stay true" to the "essence of the novel and its characters" while script-writing. He strongly hoped to "take the story forward from where" Khadija left it, into two sequels.

It is based on the partition of the Indian Subcontinent and the resulting independence of Pakistan. It depicts a Hindustani family that was divided mercilessly before the partition of Pakistan by the unfortunate time incidents. The story also has a political take, including British Raj, All-India Muslim League and Indian National Congress.

In a January 2018 interview, the director praised the simplicity of the novel, "It sheds light on the revolution that women went through in those times", and "Set in an inner courtyard, the story has been told from the perspective of a woman." On 17 October 2017, it was reported that Mawra Hocane had signed up for the project. On 28 March, Dawn Images published an interview with Mawra, in which she revealed she will be playing the protagonist and narrator of the story. The story will be told from her character's perspective, who will be seen romancing three men.

Casting and filming
On 19 October, it was reported that Ahsan Khan had also signed up, along with Sajal Aly and Ahad Raza Mir. On 4 November, Sonya Hussyn signed up for the project, all in the lead cast.

Principal photography began on 7 November in Wazirabad. Sajal confirmed her shoot on 5 December, while Mawra on 27 December. Other cast in supporting roles include Abid Ali and Zaib Rehman, along with Omair Rana and Uzma Hassan. It was revealed that Ahsan will be playing double roles in the drama, and he will be romancing three women. The first spell was completed in January 2018, and then the second spell was completed in March.

Hira Mani joined the cast in third shooting spell, also as in lead role. On 19 July, it was revealed that Rabia Butt will have a cameo role in the drama and two songs have been picturised on her. Other cast include Madiha Rizvi, Shehzad Kashmiri and Ali Rizvi. The spell took place between June and August 2018 in Karachi. On 26 September, the role of Shehroz Sabzwari was also revealed. The casting was mostly done by Momina Duraid, who reportedly kept delaying the shoots to cast the right actors she wanted, as they were not available before. Khizer Idrees has served as the cinematographer for the drama.

Promotion
Talking about her family background, Sonya Hussyn shared to The Express Tribune that she thinks she relates "to the world that Aangan is set in"; she revealed her role to be extended special appearance. Mawra Hocane told about her character to The News that they have "been developing" it "every day on set" to ensure "the sort of person Aaliya is". Ahad Raza Mir commented to The News on his character, "he's somebody who is on a journey of what love means, what family bonds mean". Ahsan commented to Something Haute that the "story revolves around the characters played by Mawra, Ahad, Sajal, Sonya, Hira and" himself, adding that they all are "connected to each other in a certain way which is very different". He further told The News that the drama is shot in "a very unique way", like never have been "seen before on Pakistani television". Sajal Aly told Gulf Times that every character "is equally important", having "its own journey", as it "follows multiple beautiful characters" and is "about everyone involved". She added that "it focuses on the partition of a family" as "physical and emotional divide of a country".

The curtain raiser, hosted by Sanam Jang, was telecast live on 13 December 2018. The drama began on 20 December, and aired an episode every Thursday.

The drama marked the second appearance of Ahsan Khan with Sonya Hussyn and with Mawra Hocane after the Haasil (2016), and Ahsan with Sonya after Marasim. It also marked the second collaboration of Ahad Raza Mir with Mawra after Sammi (2017), and with Sajal Aly and Hira Mani after the Yaqeen Ka Safar (2017). It was the fifth collaboration of the director with MD Productions after Aseerzadi (2013), Sadqay Tumhare (2014), Preet Na Kariyo Koi (2015) also starring Ahsan and Hira, and Udaari (2016) while director's third collaboration also with writer after Aseerzadi (2013) and Mohabbat.PK (2017).

Release and distribution

Broadcast
Aangan'''s first episode was aired on 20 December 2018 while before the series premiere introductional program of the show The Curtain Raiser was aired on 13 December 2018. It aired weekly episode every Thursday at 8:00pm succeeding Duraid's Main Khayal Hoon Kisi Aur Ka. It was aired on Hum Europe in UK, on Hum TV USA in USA and Hum TV Mena in UAE, with same timings and 20 December 2018 being the premier date. All International broadcasting aired the series in accordance with their standard times.

State channel PTV Home acquired the rights of syndication of series and started to telecast it from February 2020.

Home media and digital release 
After the series premiere, Hum TV announced that the episodes of the serial will not be uploaded on YouTube. Later in April 2020, Mawra Hocane who played the role of Aaliya revealed that Aangan will be released on a digital platform with some editings.

Reception

Critical response
In November 2018, the series received immense appraisal for its promos.

The series received mostly positive reviews from critics with praise towards the performances, visuals and cinematography. Aly's performance received widespread critical acclaim as is regarded as on of her and industry's best .

Aangan received positive reviews on its first episode. Reviewing the first episode of the drama, Hareem Zafar wrote to Youlin Magazine that "a promising start" with "visually aesthetic shots of the Haveli, classical music as background score, powerful dialogue delivery and masterful acting skills".

Aly's performance was called inspirational by The News. Maira Kiari of DAWN IMAGES ranked her performance and as the top 6 performances of television in 2019. After the concluding of the serial, Buraq Shabbir of The News International'' praised Sajal's performance and wrote, "Sajal Aly stole the limelight and overshadowed everyone and everything else surrounding the recently concluded play." While writing for Masala.com, Mahwash Ajaz praised the Aly's character and performance and stating, "Sajal Ali’s ‘Chammi’ is The Heroine Television Needed."

Ratings
The show was popular in UK where it mostly topped the chart among the Urdu television serials  while the 15th episode of the show took the lead among all the Asian television shows and was watched by 49,200 viewers – peaking at 50,500 viewers according to the exclusive data obtained by BizAsia.

Soundtrack

The various soundtracks were prepared for the serial. The original soundtrack "Haari Haari" was performed by Farhan Saeed and Naveed Nashad, lyrics were written by Imran Raza while composed by Nashad also. The other soundtracks such as "Bholi Bano" and "Wavella" were played and picturized on a single specific occasion.

Accolades

See also
 List of programs broadcast by Hum TV
 Artistic depictions of the partition of India

References

External links
 
 

Urdu-language television shows
2018 Pakistani television series debuts
Hum TV original programming
Period family drama television series
Pakistani television dramas based on novels
Pakistani romantic drama television series
Pakistani family television dramas
Pakistani television series endings
Partition of India in fiction
Television shows set in the British Raj
Television series set in the 1940s
Pakistani period television series